Karl Horstmann(born 2 March 1967) is an American film director, screenwriter and producer. He is best known as the producer of the The Case for Christ (2017) and as the director and producer of Fallen Angel: Call Sign – Extortion 17 (2021).

His production company is Triple Horse Studios, based in Atlanta, Georgia.

Early life 
Horstmann was born on 2 March 1967 in Norfolk, Virginia and was raised in Portsmouth, Virginia.

Career 
Horstmann began his film career in Atlanta, Georgia in the early 1990s, first as an editor and then a director at Turner Broadcasting - working on the team that launched TNT, TCM and the Cartoon Network. In 1996, he produced and directed the feature documentary The Making of Champions with NASCAR CUP team owner, Richard Childress and seven-time-champion, Dale Earnhardt. After completion of the film, Horstmann founded Triple Horse Productions, where he directed and produced hundreds of television commercials and title sequences for Coca-Cola, Under Armour, Home Depot, the NFL, NBA and Major League Baseball.

Later, Horstmann formed Triple Horse Studios to focus his efforts on larger narrative story telling. His first feature film was the small indy Stand Your Ground distributed by eONE. Horstmann's first television outing was a highly rated pair of History Channel prime-time specials exploring the mystery of the lost colony of Roanoke. Notable film credits include The Case for Christ, starring Mike Vogel, Erika Christensen and Faye Dunaway, and the feature documentary, that Horstmann also directed, entitled Fallen Angel: Call Sign Extortion 17 investigating the contradictions surrounding an Army helicopter in Afghanistan that was shot down carrying 17 members of the elite Navy SEAL Team 6, the unit that killed Osama Bin Laden.

Horstmann's 2023 scheduled film releases as Producer include Southern GospeI - a 60's era faith drama, Love, Courage and the Battle of Bushy Run - an action packed story of the decisive battle that ended the Seven Years War in 1763, the southern gothic action picture, The Daylong Brothers starring Keith Carradine, the faith drama On A Wing And A Prayer with Dennis Quaid directed by Sean McNamara, and a family friendly limited series for Sony/Affirm entitled Shadrach - the six episode, coming of age tale of a little girl and her horse also directed by McNamara.

Additionally, Horstmann is the founder of Cine Stables, a motion picture facility and equipment rental company. He is also the founder of Hitching Post Digital, a visual effects and post production services company.

Filmography

Feature films

Documentary films

Series & TV Specials

Short films

Notes

References

External links 

 
 

1967 births
Living people
American film directors
American screenwriters
American film producers
People from Norfolk, Virginia